Two on a Guillotine is a 1965 American horror film produced and directed by William Conrad and starring Connie Stevens. The screenplay by John Kneubuhl and Henry Slesar is based on a story by Slesar. The movie would be the first in a series of low-budget suspense dramas made by Warner Bros in the vein of the successful William Castle films, and was followed by My Blood Runs Cold and Brainstorm, both also released in 1965 with Conrad as director. A fourth movie,  The Thing at the Door, was proposed, but never made.

Plot
John Harley Duquesne, a psychotic magician, accidentally beheads his wife Melinda with a guillotine during a performance. Twenty years later he dies, and his will requires his daughter Cassie (the image of her mother) to spend seven nights in his apparently haunted mansion in order to inherit his estate.

Reporter Val Henderson offers to stay with her when he learns Duquesne promised to return in spirit form during Cassie's week-long vigil. As the days pass, the two encounter a number of spooky happenings, leading to a climax in which the very-much-alive Duquesne attempts a recreation of his guillotine trick, this time with his daughter as an unwilling assistant.

Henderson fights Duquesne, trying to prevent him from activating the guillotine, but accidentally releases the catch; a dummy's head falls from the guillotine causing Duquesne to break down thinking his daughter has been killed. Henderson rescues Cassie as the police come to arrest Duquesne.

Principal cast
 Connie Stevens as Cassie/Melinda Duquesne
 Dean Jones as Val Henderson
 Cesar Romero as John Harley Duquesne
 Parley Baer as Buzzy Sheridan
 Virginia Gregg as Dolly Bast
 John Hoyt as Carl Vickers

Production
Two on a Guillotine was one of a series of movies financed by Warner Bros which were made by directors who had previously worked primarily in television, such as Conrad, Lamont Johnson and Jack Smight. 

Filming started in June 1964, and lasted three weeks.

Stevens was under contract with Warner Bros. She said, "I thought the script was stupid when I read it but I came away thinking, 'yeah, it could have happened.' That's the challenge, to make something like this believable." She made the movie immediately before her series Wendy and Me, and asserted that it "could have been a Class A thriller if they'd spent more money on it." She noted that the feature did garner Conrad a seven-year contract with the studio, however.

Two on a Guillotine was the last movie scored by Max Steiner. He commented, "it wasn't a picture, it was an abortion ... The guillotine was placed in the wrong place ... they should have cut off William Conrad's head for producing the thing."

Critical reception
In his review in The New York Times, Howard Thompson called the film "a dull, silly, tedious clinker" and "an old-fashioned, haunted-house spooker." The Los Angeles Times called it "an unusually appealing love story" with "genuinely spine-tingling suspense."

TV Guide rates it two out of a possible four stars, calling it "a standard haunted house thriller."

Home media
The film was released on DVD on June 22, 2010.

Comic book adaptation
 Dell Movie Classic: Two on a Guillotine (April–June 1965)

See also
 List of American films of 1965

References

External links
 
 
 
 
Review of film at Cinema Retro
Two on a Guillotine at BFI

1965 films
1965 horror films
American supernatural horror films
American mystery films
Warner Bros. films
American black-and-white films
1960s English-language films
Films scored by Max Steiner
Films about magic and magicians
Films based on short fiction
Films directed by William Conrad
American haunted house films
Films adapted into comics
1960s American films